A chart with the best selling manga in Japan is published weekly by Oricon. This list includes the manga that reached the number one place on that chart in 2012.

Chart history

References 

2012 manga
2012 in comics
2012